The East Lancs Vyking is a type of double-decker bus body built by East Lancashire Coachbuilders. It is the double-deck version of the Spryte. It continued the long line of 'misspelt' names which continued until the Scania OmniDekka. It was built on the Volvo B7TL chassis. The name "Vyking" was derived from the chassis being built by a company from Sweden.

Options included air conditioning, additional CCTV, bonded glazing, double glazing, driver protection, electronic destination displays, powered wheelchair ramp.

Myllennium Vyking
The East Lancs Myllennium Vyking was a facelift East Lancs Vyking; they were built between 2001 and 2006. The Myllennium Vyking was built either as a closed-top or an open-top bus. The majority of Myllennium Vykings were produced for the United Kingdom on Volvo B7TL chassis, although a small number of open-top buses were produced for continental Europe on Volvo B7L chassis, for example in Luxembourg and Paris.

Specifications
The structure of the Vyking was built using the Alusuisse "System M5438" system, for optimum strength. Glazing was with laminated glass, and gasket glazing came with the bus as standard - with bonded glazing available - and had hopper opening windows. The heating was thermostatically controlled and windows and air vents provided ventilation. The seating was trimmed in customer's required moquette. The floor had a 12mm Xyligen Basileum treated Finnish Birch combi plywood floor on the lower deck and both decks a non-slip flooring. Electrical features were the fluorescent light on the bus' ceilings, and twin circular halogen headlights. Also, CCTV was available. Destination displays only came as manual as standard, doors were air operated and were made of toughened glass. A simple driver's compartment was designed, to make the driver's job easier. Two pack acrylic paint was available for the exterior.

Gallery

See also

Dennis Trident 2
DAF DB250
List of buses
Related buses

 East Lancs Myllennium
 East Lancs Lolyne
 East Lancs Lowlander
 East Lancs Myllennium Nordic

References

External links
Volvo

Double-decker buses
Vyking